Tracy Dempsey (born October 9, 1950) is an American politician who served in both houses of the West Virginia State Legislature.

References

External links

1952 births
Living people
Democratic Party West Virginia state senators
Democratic Party members of the West Virginia House of Delegates
People from Lincoln County, West Virginia